Felipe Rodrigues da Silva (born 30 June 2001), commonly known as Morato, is a Brazilian professional footballer who plays as a central defender for Portuguese club Benfica.

Club career
Born in Francisco Morato in the state of São Paulo, Morato was 18 when he moved from the youth ranks of São Paulo to Benfica in September 2019, on a contract lasting until 2024. The transfer fee was €6 million and the Brazilian club retained 15% of the rights to his next transfer.

On 22 September 2019, Morato made his professional debut for Benfica B in the LigaPro, playing the full 90 minutes of a 1–0 loss at Leixões. He made his first-team debut on 21 December in the final game of the Taça da Liga group stage, again featuring for the entirety of a 2–2 draw at Vitória de Setúbal. In the same season, he played 10 games as the under-19 team came runners-up in the UEFA Youth League, scoring in a 3–2 group win at Olympique Lyonnais on 5 November.

On 27 September 2020, Morato scored his first professional goal to open a 2–1 loss for the reserves at Mafra; on 17 October he was sent off in a 1–0 loss away to Arouca. He made his Primeira Liga debut the following 30 April in a 2–0 win at Tondela, as an added-time substitute for Pizzi. On 23 May, he started in the 2021 Taça de Portugal final, lost 2–0 to Braga in Coimbra; he had days earlier been told that he would be on the bench for that game.

Morato was given a run in the first team at the start of the 2021–22 season, due to injury to veteran Jan Vertonghen. He scored his first goal for them on 2 November, in the first half of a 5–2 loss at Bayern Munich in the UEFA Champions League group stage. The following season, under new manager Roger Schmidt, Morato earned a place in the starting eleven over Jan Vertoghen, and following a run of four consecutive wins and three clean sheets, he was named the Primeira Liga's Defender of the Month for August.

International career
Morato was called up in November 2019 to the Brazil national under-20 football team, for games against Peru and Colombia.

Career statistics

Club

Honours
Benfica
 Taça de Portugal runner-up: 2020–21
Taça da Liga runner-up: 2021–22
Individual
Primeira Liga Defender of the Month: August 2022

References

External links
 Profile at the S.L. Benfica website

2001 births
Living people
Footballers from São Paulo (state)
Brazilian footballers
Brazilian expatriate footballers
Association football defenders
São Paulo FC players
S.L. Benfica footballers
S.L. Benfica B players
Primeira Liga players
Liga Portugal 2 players
Brazilian expatriate sportspeople in Portugal
Expatriate footballers in Portugal